Montecopiolo is a comune (municipality) in the Province of Rimini in the Italian region Emilia-Romagna, located about  southeast of Bologna and about  west of Rimini. It is formed by several villages, none exactly called Montecopiolo; the communal seat is in Villagrande.

Montecopiolo borders the following municipalities: Carpegna, Macerata Feltria, Maiolo, Monte Cerignone, Monte Grimano, Pennabilli, Pietrarubbia, San Leo.

Twin towns
 Mont-Saint-Martin, France

References